Big 8 Beverages is a soft drinks company based in the town of Stellarton, near New Glasgow, Nova Scotia, Canada. Established in 1986 and owned by the Sobeys chain of supermarkets, which is also headquartered in Stellarton, the company produces fizzy soda drinks of a wide range of flavours, and also bottles spring and distilled water.

History 
The Big 8 brand name was created in the 1930s by Fenton and Day Beverages, and is now owned by Sobeys. Created in the 1930s by Fred Day and his brother-in-law George Fenton. They named their cola Big 8 after the eight-cent price for a bottle roughly a litre in size. Coca-Cola wanted to purchase Fenton and Day in 1946, but wouldn't pay what the owners thought the company was worth. Three months later 7-Up Maritimes offered the right price, founders Fenton and Day sold and retired. The Big 8 name stayed idle until Maritime Beverages, under which 7-Up is sold, gave the label to Sobeys free of charge in 1986.

Soft drink flavours
 Cola
 Diet Cola
 Diet Cola Caffeine-Free
 Big Up
 Diet Big Up
 Root Beer
 Spruce Beer
 Ginger Ale
 Diet Ginger Ale
 Golden Ginger Ale
 Cranberry Ginger Ale
 Blackberry Ginger Ale
 Cranberry/Raspberry
 Sparkling Lemonade
 Diet Sparkling Lemonade
 Lime
 Grape
 Cream Soda
 Mountain Burst
 Orange
 Diet Orange
 Pineapple
 Vanilla Cola
Big 8 Dr Zip (Similar to Dr Pepper)

Bottled water
 Soda Water
 Sparkling Lemon-Lime Water
 Sparkling Water
 Tonic Water
 Spring Water
 Distilled Water

References

External links
 

Drink companies of Canada
Food and drink companies based in Nova Scotia
Sobeys
Canadian brands
Cola brands
Products introduced in 1986
Cuisine of Nova Scotia